Melissa Febos is an American writer and professor. She is the author of the critically acclaimed memoir, Whip Smart (2010), and the essay collections, Abandon Me (2017) and Girlhood (2021).

Early life and education
Febos grew up in Falmouth, Massachusetts.  Her father was a sea captain, and her mother a therapist. She left home at 16 after passing the GED, moved to Boston, and worked at an assortment of jobs including as a boatyard hand and as a chambermaid.  She attended night courses at Harvard Extension School, then enrolled in The New School and moved to New York City in August 1999.  She later earned an MFA at Sarah Lawrence College.

Career
Febos is the author of Whip Smart (St Martin's Press 2010), a memoir of her work as a professional dominatrix while she was studying at The New School.
Her second book, the lyric essay collection Abandon Me, was published by Bloomsbury Publishing on February 28, 2017. Abandon Me was a LAMBDA Literary Award finalist and a Publishing Triangle Award finalist, and one of the best reviewed books of 2017. Her third book and second essay collection, Girlhood, was published by Bloomsbury Publishing on March 30, 2021. It was a national bestseller. Describing Girlhood, The New York Times wrote, "The aim of this book, though, is not simply to tell about her own life, but to listen to the pulses of many others’...This solidarity puts “Girlhood” in a feminist canon that includes Febos’s idol, Adrienne Rich, and Maggie Nelson’s theory-minded masterpieces: smart, radical company, and not ordinary at all." A craft book, Body Work, was published by Catapult in 2022.

Febos was the co-curator, with Rebecca Keith, of the monthly Mixer Reading and Music series on the Lower East Side for ten years.  A four-time MacDowell Colony fellow, she has received fellowships from Virginia Center for the Creative Arts, Vermont Studio Center, and the Bread Loaf Writers' Conference. Her essays have won awards from Prairie Schooner and StoryQuarterly, and for five years she was on the Board of Directors of Vida: Women in Literary Arts. Febos has contributed to publications such as The New York Times, The Paris Review, Salon, Bomb, Hunger Mountain, Prairie Schooner, The Kenyon Review, Tin House, Granta, Post Road, Dissent (American magazine), Vogue (magazine), The Believer (magazine), The Sewanee Review, Bitch Magazine and The Chronicle of Higher Education.

Febos has taught at SUNY Purchase College, the Gotham Writers' Workshop, The New School, Sarah Lawrence College, New York University, and Utica College. Until 2020, she was an Associate Professor and MFA Director at Monmouth University. Febos currently works as an Associate Professor at the University of Iowa, where she teaches in the Nonfiction Writing Program.

Media
Whip Smart resulted in a front-page appearance on the cover of the New York Post, a feature interview on NPR's radio program Fresh Air with Terry Gross, a guest appearance on Anderson Cooper's talk show, and an appearance on CNN's Dr. Drew show.

Abandon Me was one of the best reviewed essay collections of 2017 and a Lambda Literary Award finalist. The New Yorker called it "mesmerizing" and wrote that "the sheer fearlessness of the narrative is captivating."

Girlhood was featured on Morning Joe on MSNBC, and on multiple NPR programs. Girlhood won the 2021 National Book Critics Circle Award in Criticism.

Her fourth book, Body Work, was a national bestseller and Los Angeles Times Bestseller.

Personal life 
Febos identifies as queer. She lives in Iowa with her wife, the poet Donika Kelly.

She spoke at House of SpeakEasy's Seriously Entertaining program about her childhood and rethinking often-normalized experiences of bullying.

Awards

 2010 MacDowell Colony Fellowship 
 2011 MacDowell Colony Fellowship
 2012 Bread Loaf Writers Conference Fellowship
 2013 The Prairie Schooner Creative Nonfiction Prize
 2013 The Barbara Deming Memorial Fund fellowship
 2014 Virginia Center for Creative Arts Residency
 2014 A Story Quarterly Essay Prize
 2014 MacDowell Colony Fellowship
 2015 The Center for Women Writers Creative Nonfiction Prize
 2015 Lower Manhattan Cultural Council Process Space residency
 2015 Vermont Studio Center fellowship
 2017 Ragdale Residency
 2018 The Sarah Verdone Writing Award, Lower Manhattan Cultural Council
 2018 Lambda Literary Award finalist in Memoir/Biography
 2018 The Publishing Triangle finalist for the Judy Grahn Award for Lesbian Nonfiction
 2018 Lambda Literary's Jeanne Córdova Prize for Lesbian/Queer Nonfiction
 2018 BAU Institute fellowship at The Camargo Foundation
 2018 Vermont Studio Center fellowship
 2020 MacDowell Colony Fellowship
 2021 National Book Critics Circle Award in criticism
2022 National Endowment for the Arts Literature Fellowship
 2022 Guggenheim Fellowship in Nonfiction

Bibliography

References

External links

1980 births
Living people
American women bloggers
American bloggers
American dominatrices
BDSM writers
People from Falmouth, Massachusetts
Sarah Lawrence College alumni
The New School alumni
American women writers
Writers from Massachusetts
American women journalists
Monmouth University faculty
21st-century American non-fiction writers
Harvard Extension School alumni
Bisexual women
Bisexual academics
American women academics
21st-century American women writers
American bisexual writers